David Campese is a former Australia rugby union fullback and winger. Campese is considered to be a once in a generation player, and since his retirement has held the most test tries for the Wallabies with sixty-four. Between 1987 and 2006 Campese held the most international tries scored by any player, being overtaken by Japanese winger Daisuke Ohata, the current record-holder. Originally Campese overtook Scottish winger Ian Smith, who, with twenty-four international tries, held the world record from the 1930s. However, when Campese overtook Smith's record (1987), he was an active player, and grew the record out to a significant margin by his retirement (1996).

In August 2016 South African winger Bryan Habana scored his sixty-fifth try, overtaking Campese's record. Habana was just the second international player to overtake Campese.

Currently David Campese is the third highest international try-scorer in the world, and is twenty-four tries ahead of the second-most try-scoring Wallaby Chris Latham with forty.

International tries

List of International tries

Tries by opponent

References

Campese, David
International tries by Campese, David
International tries by Campese, David